The University American College Skopje (abbr. UACS) is a private university established in 2005. It is headquartered in Skopje, North Macedonia. The premises of UACS encompass 4,000 m2.

Schools 
 School of Business Administration
 School of Political Science
 School of Law
 School of Computer Science and Information Technology
 School of Architecture and Design
 School of Foreign Languages

Library resources 
The library of UACS has 1500 titles or 6500 books.

Since 2008, the Library of UACS started with publishing. The first book which was issued is Osnovi na Statistika by Evica Delova, and after that UACS library has continued with publishing of other books: Makroekonomija by Tome Nenovski, Decentralizacija na vlasta vo Republika Makedonija by Sapuric Zoran, Kon Univerzitetite od Tretata Generacija by Hans Vizema, Zivotna sredina I oddrzliv razvoj by Zoran Sapuric, and others. Besides these books, the library has published a number of readers and scripts (23) and eight books in electronic form, according to the rules laid down by the home library (NUL) in North Macedonia, which also contained in the Rules of Publishing UACS.

Student council 
The Student Council helps share students’ ideas, interests, and concerns with the teachers and principal.  It also helps students raise funds for school wide projects.

References

External links 
 

University American College Skopje
Educational institutions established in 2005
Education in Skopje
Business schools in Europe
2005 establishments in the Republic of Macedonia